Mohamed Halimi (born 17 May 1958) is an Algerian swimmer. He competed in the men's 100 metre freestyle event at the 1980 Summer Olympics.

He also competed in the men's 4 × 200 metre freestyle relay event, alongside Abdelhakim Bitat, Reda Yadi and Mohamed Bendahmane. They finished in 12th place in the heats and they did not advance to compete in the final.

References

External links
 
 Profile at abcnatation.fr

1958 births
Living people
Algerian male freestyle swimmers
Olympic swimmers of Algeria
Swimmers at the 1980 Summer Olympics
Place of birth missing (living people)
21st-century Algerian people
French male freestyle swimmers
French male backstroke swimmers
French male breaststroke swimmers
French male butterfly swimmers
Masters swimmers